Larryleachia is a genus of stapeliad succulent flowering plants in the family Apocynaceae.

Species

 Larryleachia cactiformis (Hooker) Plowes
 Larryleachia marlothii (N.E. Brown) Plowes
 Larryleachia perlata (Dinter) Plowes
 Larryleachia picta (N.E.Brown) Plowes
 Larryleachia tirasmontana (Plowes) Plowes

Taxonomy
Phylogenetic studies have shown the genus to be monophyletic, and most closely related to the stapeliad genera Richtersveldtia and Notechidnopsis. Marginally more distantly related is a sister branch of related genera including Lavrania and Hoodia.

References

 
Taxonomy articles created by Polbot
Apocynaceae genera